Loggerheads is a civil parish in the district of Newcastle-under-Lyme, Staffordshire, England.  It contains 74 buildings that are recorded in the National Heritage List for England.  Of these, four are listed at Grade II*, the middle of the three grades, and the others are at Grade II, the lowest grade.  The parish contains the villages of Loggerheads, Ashley, Hales, Knighton, and Mucklestone, and the surrounding countryside.  Most of the listed buildings are houses, cottages, farmhouses, and farm buildings, the earlier of which are timber framed.  The Shropshire Union Canal passes through the western part of the parish, and the listed buildings associated with this include bridges, locks, two mileposts, and an aqueduct.  The other listed buildings include churches, memorials in churchyards, a well house, two country houses and associated structures, a folly, a bridge, and six road mileposts.


Key

Buildings

References

Citations

Sources

Lists of listed buildings in Staffordshire
Borough of Newcastle-under-Lyme